Rodolfo "Rudy" Hernández Acosta (born October 18, 1951) is a Mexican former shortstop in Major League Baseball and Minor League Baseball manager. Listed at 5' 9", 150 lb., Hernández batted and threw right handed. He was born in Empalme, Sonora.

Career
Hernández appeared in eight games for the Chicago White Sox in its 1972 season. He was acquired by the Sox from the Charros de Jalisco of the Mexican League in July 1972. He made his majors debut on September 6 of that same year. At the age of 20, he was the fifth-youngest player to appear in an American League game that season.

During his short stint with the White Sox, he hit just .190 (4-for-21) but was excellent in the field. His four hits were against Clyde Wright, Rich Hand, Dick Bosman, and Bert Blyleven. Besides, he recorded 10 putouts and 16 assists without errors, and participated in three double plays.

Hernández was traded back to Jalisco for pitcher Francisco Barrios on December 4, 1973.

In between, Hernández had a successful career in Mexico, where he played professional baseball for 19 years, between the Mexican League and the Mexican Pacific League.

He posted a .264 batting average with 148 home runs and 958 RBI in the Mexican League. His statistics for the Mexican Pacific League have yet been registered.

Hernández also took part of a few championships, like the 1987 with Venados de Mazatlan, and the memorable 1984 with Leones de Yucatan.

External links 
, or Retrosheet

1951 births
Living people
Acereros de Monclova players
Mexicali Aguilas players
Alacranes de Campeche players
Alacranes de Durango players
Angeles de Puebla players
Baseball players from Sonora
Broncos de Reynosa players
Cafeteros de Córdoba players
Charros de Jalisco players
Charros de San Luis Potosí players
Chicago White Sox players
Iowa Oaks players
Knoxville Sox players
Leones de Yucatán players
Major League Baseball players from Mexico
Major League Baseball shortstops
Mexican expatriate baseball players in the United States
Minor league baseball managers
Sultanes de Monterrey players
Tucson Toros players
Tuneros de San Luis Potosí players
Venados de Mazatlán players
People from Empalme, Sonora